The 2019 OFC Champions League was the 18th edition of the Oceanian Club Championship, Oceania's premier club football tournament organized by the Oceania Football Confederation (OFC), and the 13th season under the current OFC Champions League name.

In the final, Hienghène Sport defeated Magenta 1–0, becoming the first team from New Caledonia to win the tournament. As the winners of the 2019 OFC Champions League, they qualified for the 2019 FIFA Club World Cup in Qatar. Team Wellington were the defending champions, but were eliminated by Hienghène Sport in the semi-finals.

Teams

A total of 18 teams from all 11 OFC member associations entered the competition.
The seven developed associations (Fiji, New Caledonia, New Zealand, Papua New Guinea, Solomon Islands, Tahiti, Vanuatu) are awarded two berths each in the group stage.
The four developing associations (American Samoa, Cook Islands, Samoa, Tonga) are awarded one berth each in the qualifying stage, with the winners and runners-up advancing to the group stage.

Schedule
The schedule of the competition was as follows. For this season, all ties in the knockout stage were played as a single match.

Qualifying stage

Group stage

Group A

Group B

Group C

Group D

Knockout stage

Bracket

Quarter-finals

Semi-finals

Final

Top goalscorers

Awards
The following awards were given at the conclusion of the tournament.

References

External links
OFC Champions League 2019, oceaniafootball.com
News > 2019 OFC Champions League

 
2019
1